The Sydney Sabres are an Australian junior ice hockey team based in Sydney playing in the Australian Junior Ice Hockey League. They represent one of the two junior ice hockey teams from New South Wales currently playing in the AJIHL, which is the most elite level for ice hockey at a national level for ages between 16–20 years old.

Team history

AJIHL

The Sydney Lightning were founded 18 September 2012 following the announcement by Ice Hockey Australia of the formation of the Australian Junior Ice Hockey League. The team is controlled by the New South Wales Ice Hockey Association. On 14 October 2012 it was announced that Jason Kvisle as coach for the 2012–13 AJIHL season with Jimmy Dufour as his assistant.

The Sydney Lightning played the first ever AJIHL game against the Melbourne Blackhawks at the Medibank Icehouse on 21 October 2012. The Lightning we defeated by the Blackhawks by a score of 5–3.

The first goal ever scored in the AJIHL was by Daniel Pataky of the Sydney Lightning.

The first team in club history:
For the 2012–13 AJIHL season

AJIHL Expansion

The follow up season in the Australian Junior Ice Hockey League saw a lot of change via expansion and renaming of its existing teams. The Sydney Lightning were renamed the Sydney Sabres in September 2013. The changes were made in response to the National Hockey Leagues concern about the AJIHL using their team names and logos but also recognised the opportunity to create a new history for the teams through creating their own identity. In October 2013 the league expanded to six teams with two teams from Perth, the Sharks and the Pelicans, joining for the start of the 2013–14 season.

Logo and Uniform

2012–2013 Sydney Lightning

In their first year, and the inaugural AJIHL season, the Sydney Lightning wore a uniform that resembled the NHL namesake Tampa Bay Lightning. The jersey design and uniform bore close resemblance to the Tampa Bay Lightning design, with the AJIHL logo used for shoulder crests.

2013–present Sydney Sabres

Season by season results

Players

Current roster

For the 2016–17 AJIHL season

Captains

 2013–14 Cameron Todd (C), Hayden Sheard (A), Casey Kubara (A)
 2014–15 Daniel Pataky (C), Joshua Hansen (A), Chris Shepherd (A)
 2015–16 Daniel Pataky (C)
 2016–17 
 2017–18

Head coaches
The first Head Coach for the Sydney Lightning in the inaugural year for the AJIHL was Jason Kvisle.

 2012–13 Jason Kvisle
 2013–14 Jason Kvisle
 2014–15 Jason Kvisle
 2015–16 Jason Kvisle
 2016–17 Jason Kvisle
 2017–18 Jason Kvisle

See also

Australian Junior Ice Hockey League
Sydney Wolf Pack
Melbourne Glaciers
Melbourne Whalers
Perth Pelicans
Perth Sharks
Ice Hockey Australia
Ice Hockey New South Wales
Australian Women's Ice Hockey League
Australian Ice Hockey League
Jim Brown Trophy
Goodall Cup
Joan McKowen Memorial Trophy

References

Australian Junior Ice Hockey League
Ice hockey teams in Australia
Sports teams in Sydney
2012 establishments in Australia
Ice hockey clubs established in 2012